Veronica alpina, the alpine speedwell or alpine veronica, is a species of flowering plant in the genus Veronica, native to Canada, Greenland, Iceland, the Faroes, Svalbard, most of Europe, parts of Siberia, northern Pakistan, the western Himalayas, and Tibet. It is the namesake of the Veronica alpina species complex, which also includes V.bellidioides, V.copelandii, V.cusickii, V.nipponica, V.nutans, V.stelleri and V.wormskjoldii.

References

alpina
Taxa named by Carl Linnaeus
Plants described in 1753